Fernando António Nogueira Pessoa (13 June 1888 – 30 November 1935) was a Portuguese poet, writer, literary critic, translator, publisher, and philosopher, described as one of the most significant literary figures of the 20th century and one of the greatest poets in the Portuguese language. He also wrote in and translated from English and French.

Pessoa was a prolific writer, and not only under his own name, for he created approximately seventy-five others, of which three stand out, Alberto Caeiro, Álvaro de Campos, and Ricardo Reis. He did not call them pseudonyms because he felt that this did not capture their true independent intellectual life and instead called them heteronyms. These imaginary figures sometimes held unpopular or extreme views.

Early life 

Pessoa was born in Lisbon on 13 June 1888. When Pessoa was five, his father, Joaquim de Seabra Pessôa, died of tuberculosis and on 2 January of the following year, his younger brother Jorge, aged one, also died.

After the second marriage of his mother, Maria Magdalena Pinheiro Nogueira, a proxy wedding to João Miguel dos Santos Rosa, Fernando sailed with his mother for South Africa in early 1896 to join his stepfather, a military officer appointed Portuguese consul in Durban, capital of the former British Colony of Natal. In a letter dated 8 February 1918, Pessoa wrote:

The young Pessoa received his early education at St. Joseph Convent School, a Roman Catholic grammar school run by Irish and French nuns. He moved to the Durban High School in April 1899, becoming fluent in English and developing an appreciation for English literature. During the Matriculation Examination, held at the time by the University of the Cape of Good Hope (forerunner of the University of Cape Town), in November 1903, he was awarded the recently created Queen Victoria Memorial Prize for best paper in English. While preparing to enter university, he also attended the Durban Commercial High School during one year, taking night classes.

Meanwhile, Pessoa started writing short stories in English, some under the name of David Merrick, many of which he left unfinished. At the age of sixteen, The Natal Mercury (edition of 6 July 1904) published his poem "Hillier did first usurp the realms of rhyme...", under the name of C. R. Anon (anonymous), along with a brief introductory text: "I read with great amusement...". In December, The Durban High School Magazine published his essay "Macaulay". From February to June 1905, in the section "The Man in the Moon", The Natal Mercury also published at least four sonnets by Fernando Pessoa: "Joseph Chamberlain", "To England I", "To England II" and "Liberty". His poems often carried humorous versions of Anon as the author's name. Pessoa started using pen names quite young. The first one, still in his childhood, was Chevalier de Pas, supposedly a French noble. In addition to Charles Robert Anon and David Merrick, the young writer also signed up, among other pen names, as Horace James Faber, Alexander Search, and other meaningful names.

In the preface to The Book of Disquiet, Pessoa wrote about himself:

The young Pessoa was described by a schoolfellow as follows:

Ten years after his arrival, he sailed for Lisbon by East through the Suez Canal on board the "Herzog", leaving Durban for good at the age of seventeen. This journey inspired the poems "Opiário" (dedicated to his friend, the poet and writer Mário de Sá-Carneiro) published on March 1915, in the literary journal Orpheu nr.1 and "Ode Marítima" (dedicated to the futurist painter Santa-Rita) published in June 1915, in Orpheu nr.2 by his heteronym Álvaro de Campos.

Lisbon revisited

While his family remained in South Africa, Pessoa returned to Lisbon in 1905 to study diplomacy. After a period of illness, and two years of poor results, a student strike against the dictatorship of Prime Minister João Franco put an end to his formal studies. Pessoa became an autodidact, a devoted reader who spent a lot of time at the library. In August 1907, he started working as a practitioner at  R.G. Dun & Company, an American mercantile information agency (currently D&B, Dun & Bradstreet). His grandmother died in September and left him a small inheritance, which he spent on setting up his own publishing house, the "Empreza Ibis". The venture was not successful and closed down in 1910, but the name ibis, the sacred bird of Ancient Egypt and inventor of the alphabet in Greek mythology, would remain an important symbolic reference for him.

Pessoa returned to his uncompleted formal studies, complementing his British education with self-directed study of Portuguese culture. The pre-revolutionary atmosphere surrounding the assassination of King Charles I and Crown Prince Luís Filipe in 1908, and the patriotic outburst resulting from the successful republican revolution in 1910, influenced the development of the budding writer; as did his step-uncle, Henrique dos Santos Rosa, a poet and retired soldier, who introduced the young Pessoa to Portuguese poetry, notably the romantics and symbolists of the 19th century.  In 1912, Fernando Pessoa entered the literary world with a critical essay, published in the cultural journal A Águia, which triggered one of the most important literary debates in the Portuguese intellectual world of the 20th century: the polemic regarding a super-Camões. In 1915 a group of artists and poets, including Fernando Pessoa, Mário de Sá-Carneiro and Almada Negreiros, created the literary magazine Orpheu, which introduced modernist literature to Portugal. Only two issues were published (Jan–Feb–Mar and Apr–May–Jun 1915), the third failed to appear due to funding difficulties. Lost for many years, this issue was finally recovered and published in 1984.  Among other writers and poets, Orpheu published Pessoa, orthonym, and the modernist heteronym, Álvaro de Campos.

Along with the artist Ruy Vaz, Pessoa also founded the art journal Athena (1924–25), in which he published verses under the  heteronyms Alberto Caeiro and Ricardo Reis. Along with his profession, as free-lance commercial translator, Fernando Pessoa undertook intense activity as a writer, literary critic and political analyst, contributing to the journals and newspapers A Águia (1912–13), A República (1913), Theatro (1913), A Renascença (1914), O Raio (1914), A Galera (1915), Orpheu (1915), O Jornal (1915), Eh Real! (1915), Exílio (1916), Centauro (1916), A Ideia Nacional (1916), Terra Nossa (1916), O Heraldo (1917), Portugal Futurista (1917), Acção (1919–20), Ressurreição (1920), Contemporânea (1922–26), Athena (1924–25), Diário de Lisboa (1924–35), Revista de Comércio e Contabilidade (1926), Sol (1926), O Imparcial (1927), Presença (1927–34), Revista Solução Editora (1929–1931), Notícias Ilustrado (1928–30), Girassol (1930), Revolução (1932), Descobrimento (1932), Fama (1932–33), Fradique (1934) and Sudoeste (1935).

Pessoa the flâneur

After his return to Portugal, when he was seventeen, Pessoa barely left his beloved city of Lisbon, which inspired the poems "Lisbon Revisited" (1923 and 1926), written under the heteronym Álvaro de Campos. From 1905 to 1920, when his family returned from Pretoria after the death of his stepfather, he lived in fifteen different locations in the city, moving from one rented room to another depending on his fluctuating finances and personal troubles.

Pessoa adopted the detached perspective of the flâneur Bernardo Soares, one of his heteronyms. This character was supposedly an accountant, working for Vasques, the boss of an office located in Douradores Street. Soares also supposedly lived in the same downtown street, a world that Pessoa knew quite well due to his long career as freelance correspondence translator. Indeed, from 1907 until his death in 1935, Pessoa worked in twenty-one firms located in Lisbon's downtown, sometimes in two or three of them simultaneously. In The Book of Disquiet, Bernardo Soares describes some of those typical places and its "atmosphere". In his daydream soliloquy he also wrote about Lisbon in the first half of the 20th century. Soares describes crowds in the streets, buildings, shops, traffic, river Tagus, the weather, and even its author, Fernando Pessoa:

A statue of Pessoa sitting at a table (below) can be seen outside A Brasileira, one of the preferred places of young writers and artists of Orpheus group during the 1910s. This coffeehouse, in the aristocratic district of Chiado, is quite close to Pessoa's birthplace: 4, São Carlos Square (just in front of Lisbon's Opera House, where stands another statue of the writer), one of the most elegant neighborhoods of Lisbon. Later on, Pessoa was a frequent customer at Martinho da Arcada, a centennial coffeehouse in Comercio Square, surrounded by ministries, almost an "office" for his private business and literary concerns, where he used to meet friends in the 1920s and 1930s.

In 1925, Pessoa wrote in English a guidebook to Lisbon but it remained unpublished until 1992.

Literature and occultism
Pessoa translated a number of Portuguese books into English, and into Portuguese The Scarlet Letter by Nathaniel Hawthorne, and the short stories "The Theory and the Hound", "The Roads We Take" and "Georgia's Ruling" by O. Henry. He has also translated into Portuguese the poetry "Godiva" by Alfred Tennyson, "Lucy" by William Wordsworth, "Catarina to Camoens" by Elizabeth Barrett Browning, "Barbara Frietchie" by John Greenleaf Whittier, and "The Raven", "Annabel Lee" and "Ulalume" by Edgar Allan Poe who, along with Walt Whitman, strongly influenced him.

As a translator, Pessoa had his own method:

In addition, Pessoa translated into Portuguese some books by the leading theosophists Helena Blavatsky, Charles Webster Leadbeater, Annie Besant, and Mabel Collins.

In 1912–14, while living with his aunt "Anica" and cousins, Pessoa took part in "semi-spiritualist sessions" that were carried out at home, but he was considered a "delaying element" by the other members of the sessions. Pessoa's interest in spiritualism was truly awakened in the second half of 1915, while translating theosophist books. This was further deepened in the end of March 1916, when he suddenly started having experiences where he believed he became a medium, having experimented with automatic writing. On June 24, 1916, Pessoa wrote an impressive letter to his aunt and godmother, then living in Switzerland with her daughter and son in law, in which he describes this "mystery case" that surprised him.

Besides automatic writing, Pessoa stated also that he had "astral" or "etherial visions" and was able to see "magnetic auras" similar to radiographic images. He felt "more curiosity than fear", but was respectful towards this phenomenon and asked secrecy, because "there is no advantage, but many disadvantages" in speaking about this. Mediumship exerted a strong influence in Pessoa's writings, who felt "sometimes suddenly being owned by something else" or having a "very curious sensation" in the right arm, which was "lifted into the air" without his will. Looking in the mirror, Pessoa saw several times what appeared to be the heteronyms: his "face fading out" and being replaced by the one of "a bearded man", or another one, four men in total.

Pessoa also developed a strong interest in astrology, becoming a competent astrologer. He elaborated hundreds of horoscopes, including well-known people such as William Shakespeare, Lord Byron, Oscar Wilde, Chopin, Robespierre, Napoleon I, Benito Mussolini, Wilhelm II, Leopold II of Belgium, Victor Emmanuel III, Alfonso XIII, or the Kings Sebastian and Charles of Portugal, and Salazar. In 1915, he created the heteronym Raphael Baldaya, an astrologer who planned to write "System of Astrology" and "Introduction to the Study of Occultism". Pessoa established the pricing of his astrological services from 500 to 5,000 réis and made horoscopes of relatives, friends, customers, also of himself and astonishingly of the heteronyms and journals as Orpheu.

Pessoa was born on June 13. The characters of the main heteronyms were inspired by the four astral elements: air, fire, water and earth. It means that Pessoa and his heteronyms altogether constituted the full principles of ancient knowledge. Those heteronyms were designed according to their horoscopes, all including Mercury, the planet of literature. Astrology was part of his everyday life and Pessoa kept that interest until his death, which he was able to predict with some accuracy.

As a mysticist, Pessoa was an enthusiast of esotericism, occultism, hermetism, numerology and alchemy. Along with spiritualism and astrology, he also paid attention to neopaganism, theosophy, rosicrucianism and freemasonry, which strongly influenced his literary work. He has declared himself a Pagan, in the sense of an "intellectual mystic of the sad race of the Neoplatonists from Alexandria" and a believer in "the Gods, their agency and their real and materially superior existence". His interest in occultism led Pessoa to correspond with Aleister Crowley and later helped him to elaborate a fake suicide, when Crowley visited Portugal in 1930. Pessoa translated Crowley's poem "Hymn To Pan" into Portuguese, and the catalogue of Pessoa's library shows that he possessed Crowley's books Magick in Theory and Practice and Confessions. Pessoa also wrote on Crowley's doctrine of Thelema in several fragments, including Moral.

Pessoa declared about secret societies:

Literary critic Martin Lüdke described Pessoa's philosophy as a kind of pandeism, especially those writings under the heteronym Alberto Caeiro.

Writing a lifetime

In his early years, Pessoa was influenced by major English classic poets such as Shakespeare, Milton and Pope, or romantics like Shelley, Byron, Keats, Wordsworth, Coleridge and Tennyson. After his return to Lisbon in 1905, Pessoa was influenced by French symbolists and decadentists as Charles Baudelaire, Maurice Rollinat, Stéphane Mallarmé; mainly by Portuguese poets as Antero de Quental, Gomes Leal, Cesário Verde, António Nobre, Camilo Pessanha or Teixeira de Pascoaes. Later on, he was also influenced by modernists as W. B. Yeats, James Joyce, Ezra Pound and T. S. Eliot, among many other writers.

During World War I, Pessoa wrote to a number of British publishers, namely Constable & Co. Ltd. (currently Constable & Robinson), trying to arrange publication of his collection of English verse The Mad Fiddler (unpublished during his lifetime), but it was refused. However, in 1920, the prestigious literary journal Athenaeum included one of those poems. Since the attempt at British publication failed, in 1918 Pessoa published in Lisbon two slim volumes of English verse: Antinous and 35 Sonnets, received by the British literary press without enthusiasm. Along with some friends, he founded another publishing house – Olisipo – which published in 1921 a further two English poetry volumes: English Poems I–II and English Poems III by Fernando Pessoa. In his publishing house, Pessoa issued also some books by his friends: A Invenção do Dia Claro (The invention of the clear day) by José de Almada Negreiros, Canções (Songs) by António Botto, and Sodoma Divinizada (Deified Sodom) by Raul Leal (Henoch). Olisipo closed down in 1923, following the scandal known as "Literatura de Sodoma" (Literature of Sodom), which Pessoa started with his paper "António Botto e o Ideal Estético em Portugal" (António Botto and the aesthetical ideal in Portugal), published in the journal Contemporanea.

Politically, Pessoa described himself as "a British-style conservative, that is to say, liberal within conservatism and absolutely anti-reactionary," and adhered closely to the Spencerian individualism of his upbringing. He described his brand of nationalism as "mystic, cosmopolitan, liberal, and anti-Catholic." He was an outspoken elitist and aligned himself against communism, socialism, fascism and Catholicism. He initially rallied to the First Portuguese Republic but the ensuing instability caused him to reluctantly support the military coups of 1917 and 1926 as a means of restoring order and preparing the transition to a new constitutional normality. He wrote a pamphlet in 1928 supportive of the military dictatorship but after the establishment of the New State, in 1933, Pessoa became disenchanted with the regime and wrote critically of Salazar and fascism in general, maintaining a hostile stance towards its corporatist program, illiberalism, and censorship. In the beginning of 1935, Pessoa was banned by the Salazar regime, after he wrote in defense of Freemasonry. The regime also suppressed two articles Pessoa wrote in which he condemned Mussolini's invasion of Abyssinia and fascism as a threat to human liberty everywhere.

On 29 November 1935, Pessoa was taken to the Hospital de São Luís, suffering from abdominal pain and a high fever; there he wrote, in English, his last words: "I know not what tomorrow will bring." He died the next day, 30 November 1935, around 8 pm, aged 47. His cause of death is commonly given as cirrhosis of the liver, due to alcoholism, though this is disputed: others attribute his death to pancreatitis (again from alcoholism), or other ailments.

In his lifetime, he published four books in English and one alone in Portuguese: Mensagem (Message). However, he left a lifetime of unpublished, unfinished or just sketchy work in a domed, wooden trunk (25,574 manuscript and typed pages which have been housed in the Portuguese National Library since 1988). The heavy burden of editing this huge work is still in progress. In 1985 (fifty years after his death), Pessoa's remains were moved to the Hieronymites Monastery, in Lisbon, where Vasco da Gama, Luís de Camões, and Alexandre Herculano are also buried. Pessoa's portrait was on the 100-escudo banknote.

The triumphant day

As the fake heteronym Coelho Pacheco, over a long period Pessoa's "triumphant day" was taken as real, however, it has been proved that this event was one more fiction created by Pessoa.

Heteronyms

Pessoa's earliest heteronym, at the age of six, was Chevalier de Pas. Other childhood heteronyms included Dr. Pancrácio and David Merrick, followed by Charles Robert Anon, a young Englishman who became Pessoa's alter ego. In 1905/7, when Pessoa was a student at the University of Lisbon, Alexander Search took the place of Anon. The main reason for this was that, although Search was English, he was born in Lisbon, as was his author. But Search represents a transition heteronym that Pessoa used while searching to adapt to the Portuguese cultural reality. After the republican revolution, in 1910, and consequent patriotic atmosphere, Pessoa created another alter ego, Álvaro de Campos, supposedly a Portuguese naval and mechanical engineer, who was born in Tavira, hometown of Pessoa's ancestors, and graduated in Glasgow. Translator and literary critic Richard Zenith notes that Pessoa eventually established at least seventy-two heteronyms. According to Pessoa himself, there are three main heteronyms: Alberto Caeiro, Álvaro de Campos and Ricardo Reis. Pessoa's heteronyms differ from pen names, because they possess distinct biographies, temperaments, philosophies, appearances, writing styles and even signatures. Thus, heteronyms often disagree on various topics, argue and discuss with each other about literature, aesthetics, philosophy, etc.

Pessoa wrote on the heteronyms:

Pessoa's heteronyms, pseudonyms, and characters

Alberto Caeiro

Alberto Caeiro was Pessoa's first great heteronym; it is summarized by Pessoa as follows: "He sees things with the eyes only, not with the mind. He does not let any thoughts arise when he looks at a flower... the only thing a stone tells him is that it has nothing at all to tell him... this way of looking at a stone may be described as the totally unpoetic way of looking at it. The stupendous fact about Caeiro is that out of this sentiment, or rather, absence of sentiment, he makes poetry."

What this means, and what makes Caeiro such an original poet is the way he apprehends existence. He does not question anything whatsoever; he calmly accepts the world as it is. The recurrent themes to be found in nearly all of Caeiro's poems are wide-eyed childlike wonder at the infinite variety of nature, as noted by a critic. He is free of metaphysical entanglements. Central to his world-view is the idea that in the world around us, all is surface: things are precisely what they seem, there is no hidden meaning anywhere.

He manages thus to free himself from the anxieties that batter his peers; for Caeiro, things simply exist and we have no right to credit them with more than that. Caeiro attains happiness by not questioning, and by thus avoiding doubts and uncertainties. He apprehends reality solely through his eyes, through his senses. Octavio Paz called him the innocent poet. Paz made a shrewd remark on the heteronyms: In each are particles of negation or unreality. Reis believes in form, Campos in sensation, Pessoa in symbols. Caeiro doesn't believe in anything. He exists.

Poetry before Caeiro was essentially interpretative; what poets did was to offer an interpretation of their perceived surroundings; Caeiro does not do this. Instead, he attempts to communicate his senses, and his feelings, without any interpretation whatsoever.

Caeiro attempts to approach Nature from a qualitatively different mode of apprehension; that of simply perceiving (an approach akin to phenomenological approaches to philosophy). Poets before him would make use of intricate metaphors to describe what was before them; not so Caeiro: his self-appointed task is to bring these objects to the reader's attention, as directly and simply as possible. Caeiro sought a direct experience of the objects before him.

As such it is not surprising to find that Caeiro has been called an anti-intellectual, anti-Romantic, anti-subjectivist, anti-metaphysical...an anti-poet, by critics; Caeiro simply-is. He is in this sense very unlike his creator Fernando Pessoa: Pessoa was besieged by metaphysical uncertainties; these were, to a large extent, the cause of his unhappiness; not so Caeiro: his attitude is anti-metaphysical; he avoided uncertainties by adamantly clinging to a certainty: his belief that there is no meaning behind things. Things, for him, simply-are.

Caeiro represents a primal vision of reality, of things. He is the pagan incarnate. Indeed, Caeiro was not simply a pagan but paganism itself.

The critic Jane M. Sheets sees the insurgence of Caeiro — who was Pessoa's first major heteronym — as essential in founding the later poetic personae: By means of this artless yet affirmative anti-poet, Caeiro, a short-lived but vital member of his coterie, Pessoa acquired the base of an experienced and universal poetic vision. After Caeiro's tenets had been established, the avowedly poetic voices of Campos, Reis and Pessoa himself spoke with greater assurance.

Ricardo Reis

In a letter to William Bentley,  Pessoa wrote that "a knowledge of the language would be indispensable, for instance, to appraise the 'Odes' of Ricardo Reis, whose Portuguese would draw upon him the blessing of António Vieira, as his stile and diction that of Horace (he has been called, admirably I believe, 'a Greek Horace who writes in Portuguese')".

Reis, both a character and a heteronym of Fernando Pessoa himself, sums up his philosophy of life in his own words, admonishing, "See life from a distance. Never question it. There's nothing it can tell you." Like Caeiro, whom he admires, Reis defers from questioning life. He is a modern pagan who urges one to seize the day and accept fate with tranquility. "Wise is the one who does not seek. The seeker will find in all things the abyss, and doubt in himself." In this sense, Reis shares essential affinities with Caeiro.

Believing in the Greek gods, yet living in a Christian Europe, Reis feels that his spiritual life is limited and true happiness cannot be attained. This, added to his belief in Fate as a driving force for all that exists, as such disregarding freedom, leads to his epicureanist philosophy, which entails the avoidance of pain, defending that man should seek tranquility and calm above all else, avoiding emotional extremes.

Where Caeiro wrote freely and spontaneously, with joviality, of his basic, meaningless connection to the world, Reis writes in an austere, cerebral manner, with premeditated rhythm and structure and a particular attention to the correct use of the language when approaching his subjects of, as characterized by Richard Zenith, "the brevity of life, the vanity of wealth and struggle, the joy of simple pleasures, patience in time of trouble, and avoidance of extremes".

In his detached, intellectual approach, he is closer to Fernando Pessoa's constant rationalization, as such representing the orthonym's wish for measure and sobriety and a world free of troubles and respite, in stark contrast to Caeiro's spirit and style. As such, where Caeiro's predominant attitude is that of joviality, his sadness being accepted as natural ("My sadness is a comfort for it is natural and right."), Reis is marked by melancholy, saddened by the impermanence of all things.

Ricardo Reis is the main character of José Saramago's 1986 novel The Year of the Death of Ricardo Reis.

Álvaro de Campos

[[File:Portugal Futurista 1 1917.jpg|thumb|right|200px|Portugal Futurista, the art journal that published Campos "Ultimatum" in 1917.]]

Álvaro de Campos manifests, in a way, as a hyperbolic version of Pessoa himself. Of the three heteronyms he is the one who feels most strongly, his motto being 'to feel everything in every way.' 'The best way to travel,' he wrote, 'is to feel.' As such, his poetry is the most emotionally intense and varied, constantly juggling two fundamental impulses: on the one hand a feverish desire to be and feel everything and everyone, declaring that 'in every corner of my soul stands an altar to a different god' (alluding to Walt Whitman's desire to 'contain multitudes'), on the other, a wish for a state of isolation and a sense of nothingness.

As a result, his mood and principles varied between violent, dynamic exultation, as he fervently wishes to experience the entirety of the universe in himself, in all manners possible (a particularly distinctive trait in this state being his futuristic leanings, including the expression of great enthusiasm as to the meaning of city life and its components) and a state of nostalgic melancholy, where life is viewed as, essentially, empty.

One of the poet's constant preoccupations, as part of his dichotomous character, is that of identity: he does not know who he is, or rather, fails at achieving an ideal identity. Wanting to be everything, and inevitably failing, he despairs. Unlike Caeiro, who asks nothing of life, he asks too much. In his poetic meditation 'Tobacco Shop' he asks:

Summaries of selected works
Message

Mensagem, written in Portuguese, is a symbolist epic made up of 44 short poems organized in three parts or Cycles:

The first, called "Brasão" (Coat-of-Arms), relates Portuguese historical protagonists to each of the fields and charges in the Portuguese coat of arms. The first two poems ("The castles" and "The escutcheons") draw inspiration from the material and spiritual natures of Portugal. Each of the remaining poems associates to each charge a historical personality. Ultimately they all lead to the Golden Age of Discovery.

The second Part, called "Mar Português" (Portuguese Sea), references the country's Age of Portuguese Exploration and to its seaborne Empire that ended with the death of King Sebastian at El-Ksar el Kebir (Alcácer-Quibir in Portuguese) in 1578. Pessoa brings the reader to the present as if he had woken up from a dream of the past, to fall in a dream of the future: he sees King Sebastian returning and still bent on accomplishing a Universal Empire.

The third Cycle, called "O Encoberto" ("The Hidden One"), refers to Pessoa's vision of a future world of peace and the Fifth Empire (which, according to Pessoa, is spiritual and not material, because if it were material England would already have achieved it). After the Age of Force (Vis), and Taedium (Otium) will come Science (understanding) through a reawakening of "The Hidden One", or "King Sebastian". The Hidden One represents the fulfillment of the destiny of mankind, designed by God since before Time, and the accomplishment of Portugal.

King Sebastian is very important, indeed he appears in all three parts of Mensagem. He represents the capacity of dreaming, and believing that it's possible to achieve dreams.

One of the most famous quotes from Mensagem is the first line from O Infante (belonging to the second Part), which is Deus quer, o homem sonha, a obra nasce (which translates roughly to "God wishes, man dreams, the work is born"). Another well-known quote from Mensagem is the first line from Ulysses, "O mito é o nada que é tudo" (a possible translation is "The myth is the nothing that is all"). This poem refers to  Ulysses, king of Ithaca, as Lisbon's founder (recalling an ancient Greek myth).

Literary essays

In 1912, Fernando Pessoa wrote a set of essays (later collected as The New Portuguese Poetry) for the cultural journal A Águia (The Eagle), founded in Oporto, in December 1910, and run by the republican association Renascença Portuguesa. In the first years of the Portuguese Republic, this cultural association was started by republican intellectuals led by the writer and poet Teixeira de Pascoaes, philosopher Leonardo Coimbra and historian Jaime Cortesão, aiming for the renewal of Portuguese culture through the aesthetic movement called Saudosismo.  Pessoa contributed to the journal A Águia with a series of papers: 'The new Portuguese Poetry Sociologically Considered' (nr. 4), 'Relapsing…' (nr. 5) and 'The Psychological Aspect of the new Portuguese Poetry' (nrs. 9,11 and 12). These writings were strongly encomiastic to saudosist literature, namely the poetry of Teixeira de Pascoaes and Mário Beirão. The articles disclose Pessoa as a connoisseur of modern European literature and an expert of recent literary trends. On the other hand, he does not care much for a methodology of analysis or problems in the history of ideas. He states his confidence that Portugal would soon produce a great poet – a super-Camões – pledged to make an important contribution for European culture, and indeed, for humanity.

Philosophical essays
The philosophical notes of the young Pessoa, mostly written between 1905 and 1912, illustrate his debt to the history of Philosophy more through commentators than through a first-hand protracted reading of the Classics, ancient or modern. The issues he engages with pertain to every philosophical discipline and concern a large profusion of concepts, creating a vast semantic spectrum in texts whose length varies between half a dozen lines and half a dozen pages and whose density of analysis is extremely variable; simple paraphrasis, expression of assumptions and original speculation.

Pessoa sorted the philosophical systems thus:

 Relative Spiritualism and relative Materialism privilege "Spirit" or "Matter" as the main pole that organizes data around Experience.
 Absolute Spiritualist and Absolute Materialist "deny all objective reality to one of the elements of Experience".
 The materialistic Pantheism of Spinoza and the spiritualizing Pantheism of Malebranche, "admit that experience is a double manifestation of any thing that in its essence has no matter neither spirit".
 Considering both elements as an "illusory manifestation", of a transcendent and true and alone realities, there is Transcendentalism, inclined into matter with Schopenhauer, or into spirit, a position where Bergson could be emplaced.
 A terminal system "the limited and summit of metaphysics" would not radicalize – as poles of experience – one of the single categories: matter, relative, absolute, real, illusory, spirit. Instead, matching all categories, it takes contradiction as "the essence of the universe" and defends that "an affirmation is so more true insofar the more contradiction involves". The transcendent must be conceived beyond categories. There is one only and eternal example of it. It is that cathedral of thought -the philosophy of Hegel.
Such pantheist transcendentalism is used by Pessoa to define the project that "encompasses and exceeds all systems"; to characterize the new poetry of Saudosismo''' where the "typical contradiction of this system" occurs; to inquire of the particular social and political results of its adoption as the leading cultural paradigm; and, at last, he hints that metaphysics and religiosity strive "to find in everything a beyond".

Works
 Antinous: a poem, Lisbon: Monteiro & Co., 1918 (16 p., 20 cm). Portugal: PURL.35 Sonnets, Lisbon: Monteiro & Co., 1918 (20 pp., 20 cm). Portugal: PURL.English Poems, 2 vol. (vol. 1 part I – Antinous, part II – Inscriptions; vol. 2 part III – Epithalamium), Lisbon: Olisipo, 1921 (vol. 1, 20 pp.; vol. 2, 16 pp., 24 cm). Portugal: PURL.Selected Poems, tr. Edwin Honig, Swallow Press, 1971. ISBN B000XU4FE4Selected Poems, tr. Peter Rickard, University of Texas Press, 1972The Book of Disquiet (first published 1982; multiple translations and editions exist)Fernando Pessoa: Self-Analysis and Thirty Other Poems, tr. George Monteiro, Gavea-Brown Publications, 1989. Message, tr. Jonathan Griffin, introduction by Helder Macedo, Menard Press, 1992. The anarchist banker and other Portuguese stories. Carcanet Press, 1996. The Keeper of Sheep, bilingual edition, tr. Edwin Honig & Susan M. Brown, Sheep Meadow, 1997. Fernando Pessoa & Co: Selected Poems, tr. Richard Zenith, Grove Press, 1999. Selected Poems: with New Supplement  tr. Jonathan Griffin, Penguin Classics; 2nd edition, 2000. Sheep's Vigil by a Fervent Person: A Translation of Alberto Caeiro/Fernando Pessoa, tr. Erin Moure, House of Anansi, 2001. The Education of the Stoic, tr. Richard Zenith, afterword by Antonio Tabucchi, Exact Change, 2004. A Little Larger Than the Entire Universe: Selected Poems, tr. Richard Zenith, Penguin Classics, 2006. A Centenary Pessoa, tr. Keith Bosley & L. C. Taylor, foreword by Octavio Paz, Carcanet Press, 2006. Philosophical Essays: A Critical Edition. Edited with notes and introduction by Nuno Ribeiro. New York: Contra Mundum Press, 2012. The Transformation Book — or Book of Tasks. Edited with notes and introduction by Nuno Ribeiro and Cláudia Souza. New York: Contra Mundum Press, 2014.The Complete Works of Alberto Caeiro. Edited by Jerónimo Pizarro and Patricio Ferrari, translated by Margaret Jull Costa and Patricio Ferrari. New Directions, 2020.The Complete Works of Álvaro de Campos, translated by Patricio Ferrari and Margaret Jull Costa. New Directions, 2023.

See also

 Geração de Orpheu
 Heteronym
 Álvaro de Campos
 The Book of Disquiet The Year of the Death of Ricardo Reis Portuguese poetry
 Dreams of SpeakingNotes

References

Further reading

Books
 Zenith, Richard. Pessoa: A Biography. New York: Liveright Publishing Corporation, 2021, . 
 Gray de Castro, Mariana (ed.). Fernando Pessoa's modernity without frontiers: influences, dialogues, responses. Woodbridge, Suffolk, UK. Rochester, NY; USA: Oxford: Tamesis, 2013, .
 Jackson, Kenneth David. Adverse Genres in Fernando Pessoa. New York; Oxford: Oxford University Press, 2010.
 Jennings, Hubert D. and Carlos Pittella. Fernando Pessoa, the Poet with Many Faces: A biography and anthology. Providence, RI: Gavea-Brown, 2018.
 Klobucka, Anna and Mark Sabine, (eds.). Embodying Pessoa: Corporeality, Gender, Sexuality. Toronto: University of Toronto Press, 2007.
 Santos, Maria Irene Ramalho Sousa. Atlantic Poets: Fernando Pessoa's Turn in Anglo-American Modernism. Hanover, NH: University Press of New England, 2003.
 Pessoa's Alberto Caeiro. Dartmouth, Mass.: University of Massachusetts Dartmouth, 2000.
 Monteiro, George. Fernando Pessoa and Nineteenth-century Anglo-American Literature. Lexington, KY: University Press of Kentucky, 2000.
 Monteiro, George. The Presence of Pessoa: English, American, and Southern African Literary Responses. Lexington, KY: University Press of Kentucky, 1998.
 Sadlier, Darlene J. An Introduction to Fernando Pessoa, Literary Modernist. Gainesville, FL: University Press of Florida, 1998.
 Lancastre, Maria José de and Antonio Tabucchi. Fernando Pessoa: Photographic Documentation and Caption.Paris : Hazan, 1997.
 Kotowicz, Zbigniew. Fernando Pessoa: Voices of a Nomadic Soul. London: Menard, 1996.
 Lisboa, Eugénio and L. C. Taylor. A Centenary Pessoa. Manchester, England: Carcanet, 1995.
 Terlinden-Villepin, Anne. Fernando Pessoa: The Bilingual Portuguese Poet. Brussels: Facultés universitaires Saint-Louis, 1990.
 McGuirk, Bernard. Three Persons on One: A Centenary Tribute to Fernando Pessoa. Nottingham, England: University of Nottingham, 1988.
 Green, J. C. R. Fernando Pessoa: The Genesis of the Heteronyms. Isle of Skye: Aquila, 1982.
 Monteiro, George. The Man Who Never Was: Essays on Fernando Pessoa. Providence, RI: Gávea-Brown, 1982.
 Zenith, Richard. An Experimental Life. Allen Lane, 2021.

Articles
 Anderson, R. N., "The Static Drama of Pessoa, Fernando" Hispanofila (104): 89–97 (January 1992).
 Bloom, Harold, "Fernando Pessoa" in Genius: A Mosaic of One Hundred Exemplary Creative Minds. New York: Warner Books, 2002.
 Brown, S.M., "The Whitman Pessoa Connection" Walt Whitman Quarterly Review 9 (1): 1–14 SUM 1991.
 Bunyan, D, "The South-African Pessoa: Fernando 20th Century Portuguese Poet", English in Africa 14 (1), May 1987, pp. 67–105.
 Cruz, Anne J., "Masked Rhetoric: Contextuality in Fernando Pessoa's Poems", Romance Notes, vol. XXIX, no. 1 (Fall, 1988), pp. 55–60.
 De Castro, Mariana, "Oscar Wilde, Fernando Pessoa, and the art of lying". Portuguese Studies 22 (2): 219, 2006.
 Dyer, Geoff, "Heteronyms" The New Statesman, vol. 4 (6 December 1991), p. 46.
 Eberstadt, Fernanda, "Proud of His Obscurity", The New York Times Book Review, vol. 96, (1 September 1991), p. 26.
 Ferari, Patricio. "Proverbs in Fernando Pessoa's works." Proverbium vol. 31, pp. 235–244.
 Guyer, Leland, "Fernando Pessoa and the Cubist Perspective", Hispania, vol. 70, no. 1 (March 1987), pp. 73–78.
 Haberly, David T., "Fernando Pessoa: Overview" in Lesley Henderson (Ed.), Reference Guide to World Literature, 2nd ed. St. James Press, 1995.
 Hicks, J., "The Fascist imaginary in Pessoa and Pirandello" Centennial Review 42 (2): 309–332 SPR 1998.
 Hollander, John, "Quadrophenia" The New Republic, 7 September 1987, pp. 33–6.
 Howes, R. W., "Pessoa, Fernando, Poet, Publisher, and Translator", British Library Journal 9 (2): 161–170 1983.
 Jennings, Hubert D., "In Search of Fernando Pessoa" Contrast 47 – South African Quarterly, vol. 12 no. 3 (June 1979).
 Lopes J. M., "Cubism and intersectionism in Fernando Pessoa's 'Chuva Obliqua" Texte (15–16),1994, pp.  63–95.
 Mahr, G., "Pessoa, life narrative, and the dissociative process" in Biography 21 (1) Winter 1998, pp. 25–35.
 McNeill, Pods, "The aesthetic of fragmentation and the use of personae in the poetry of Fernando Pessoa and W.B. Yeats" Portuguese Studies 19: 110–121 2003.
 Monteiro, George, "The Song of the Reaper-Pessoa and Wordsworth" Portuguese Studies 5, 1989, pp. 71–80.
 Muldoon P., "In the hall of mirrors: 'Autopsychography' by Fernando Pessoa" New England Review 23 (4), Fal 2002, pp. 38–52.
 Pasi, Marco, "September 1930, Lisbon: Aleister Crowley’s lost diary of his Portuguese trip" Pessoa Plural, no. 1 (Spring 2012), pp. 253–283.
 Pasi, Marco & Ferrari, Patricio, "Fernando Pessoa and Aleister Crowley: New discoveries and a new analysis of the documents in the Gerald Yorke Collection" Pessoa Plural, no. 1 (Spring 2012), pp. 284–313.
 Phillips, A., "Pessoa's Appearances" in Promises, Promises. London: Faber and Faber Limited, 2000, pp. 113–124.
 Ribeiro, A. S., "A tradition of empire: Fernando Pessoa and Germany" Portuguese Studies 21: 201–209, 2005
 Riccardi, Mattia, "Dionysus or Apollo? The heteronym Antonio Mora as moment of Nietzsche's reception by Pessoa" Portuguese Studies 23 (1), 109, 2007.
 Rosenthal, David H., "Unpredictable Passions", The New York Times Book Review, 13 December 1987, p. 32.
 Seabra, J.A., "Pessoa, Fernando Portuguese Modernist Poet", Europe 62 (660): 41–53 1984.
 Severino, Alexandrino E., "Fernando Pessoa's Legacy: The Presença and After", World Literature Today, vol. 53, no. 1 (Winter, 1979), pp. 5–9.
 Severino, Alexandrino E., "Pessoa, Fernando – A Modern Lusiad", Hispania 67 (1): 52–60 1984.
 Severino, Alexandrino E., "Was Pessoa Ever in South Africa?" Hispania, vol. 74, no. 3 (September 1991).
 Sheets, Jane M., "Fernando Pessoa as Anti-Poet: Alberto Caeiro", Bulletin of Hispanic Studies, vol. XLVI, no. 1 (January 1969), pp. 39–47.
 Sousa, Ronald W., "The Structure of Pessoa's Mensagem", Bulletin of Hispanic Studies, vol. LIX, no. 1, January 1982, pp. 58–66.
 Steiner, George, "A man of many parts", The Observer, 3 June 2001.
 Suarez, Jose, "Fernando Pessoa's acknowledged involvement with the occult" Hispania 90 (2): (May 2007), 245–252.
 Wood, Michael, "Mod and Great" The New York Review of Books, vol. XIX, no. 4 (21 September 1972), pp. 19–22.
 Zenith, Richard, "Pessoa, Fernando and the Theater of his Self" Performing Arts Journal (44), May 1993, pp. 47–49.

Videos

 Professor David Jackson: Adverse Genres in Fernando Pessoa 10:20. Yale University, 11/12/2009. 
Professor Jacksons research interests focus on Portuguese and Brazilian Literatures; modernist and inter-arts literature; Portuguese culture in Asia; and ethnomusicology.  He has written and edited several books and other publications. We talk with Professor Jackson about his forthcoming book, Adverse Genres in Fernando Pessoa.

 PESSOA & OTHER POETS IN THE PORTUGUESE: An Evening with Translator Richard Zenith 1:35:17. 
November 18, 2013, at the Woodberry Poetry Room, Harvard University.
As a part of our Omniglot Seminar series, Portuguese translator Richard Zenith read from his translations of Luís de Camões, Fernando Pessoa and Carlos Drummond de Andrade. He compared his experiences translating archaic vs. contemporary linguistic registers, highly formal poetry vs. free verse, and European vs. Brazilian Portuguese. And he discussed the unique challenge of translating (and researching a biography of) a poet such as Pessoa, with alter egos that wrote in radically different styles.

 Fernando Pessoa: An Englishly Portuguese, Endlessly Multiple Poet 1:04:12. Library of Congress, 22/04/2015.
Richard Zenith presented a lecture on Fernando Pessoa, one of Portugal's most important literary figures of the 20th century and a towering figure in modernism.

 I Don't know How Many Souls I Have - Fernando Pessoa 02:16. WisdoMango, 15/11/2020.
In this poem, Pessoa creates an inner struggle that the speaker has with trying to figure out whether it was fate or free will that has determined how his life panned out. By making the whole poem essentially one, elongated metaphor, Pessoa is able to give multiple interpretations to his poem. In the titular first line of the first stanza, Pessoa states “I don’t know how many souls I have”. Automatically, Pessoa causes the speaker to question his morality and inner being. Line two of the first stanza has a literal translation of “each time changed.” When put in context, it becomes apparent that the speaker is referring to himself that changes so often. These two lines become the foundation for the rest of the poem, seeing as they set up a questioning within the speaker. The translations of these two lines are also crucial to fully grasp the meaning of the poem as a whole.

 Fine Poetry - Poems of Fernando Pessoa 15:46. Richard Eggenberger, 31/01/2018.
 "Pop" by Fernando Pessoa, translated by Richard Zenith 01:14. Poem read by David Novak, 07/01/2021.

External links

 Pessoa's Museum in Lisbon Fernando Pessoa House
 Pessoa's private library free downloads from the digital library at Pessoa's Museum
 Message the only Portuguese book by Fernando Pessoa published during his lifetime
 Works by Fernando Pessoa at the Portuguese Digital Library
 
 
 
 Pessoa Plural: Revista de Estudos Pessoanos – A Journal of Fernando Pessoa Studies 
 Project Estranhar Pessoa 
 Antinous free download from the Portuguese Digital Library
 35 Sonnets free download from the Portuguese Digital Library
 English Poems free download from the Portuguese Digital Library
 Mensagem free download from the Portuguese Digital Library
 "Portugal Holds on to Words Few Can Grasp" by Michael Kimmelman, The New York Times'', 15 July 2008
 Poets.org Biography
 Pessoa's trunk 13+ ways of looking at a poem
 Kannada translation of 4 poems by Fernando Pessoa - Translated by S. Jayasrinivasa Rao - published in avadhimag.in
 Kannada translation of 4 more poems by Fernando Pessoa - Translated by S. Jayasrinivasa Rao - published in Bhasha Bharathi: A Peer-Reviewed Kannada Triannual Journal, Vol. 4, September-December 2021. Pp. 86-94
 Arquivo Pessoa
 Pessoa by Eveleigh The many faces of Fernando Pessoa by Aldous Eveleigh
 Fernando Pessoa Tour Audio documentary series about the life and legacy of Fernando Pessoa by Sofia Saldanha
 35 English Sonnets by Fernando Pessoa (audio)

 
1888 births
1935 deaths
Deaths from cirrhosis
Exophonic writers
Modernist poets
Writers from Durban
People from Lisbon
Portuguese male poets
Portuguese occultists
Portuguese philosophers
Portuguese essayists
Rosicrucians
University of Lisbon alumni
20th-century Portuguese poets
20th-century Portuguese philosophers
Portuguese modern pagans
Modern pagan poets
20th-century essayists
Alcohol-related deaths in Portugal
Modern pagan philosophers
20th-century pseudonymous writers